The Lord Is My Shepherd is an 1863 oil on wood painting by American artist Eastman Johnson. The painting measures 16 5/8 x 13 1/8 in. (42.3 x 33.2 cm.) and is on display at the Smithsonian American Art Museum, in Washington, D.C.

The title of the painting comes from Psalm 23, which begins with the line: "The Lord is my shepherd; I shall not want." Johnson painted it just after the Emancipation Proclamation was announced in 1863. Its imagery includes an African-American man reading the first part of a Bible, possibly the Book of Exodus. He is sitting against a blue jacket, which may indicate service in the Union army. President Abraham Lincoln had recently authorized organization of the United States Colored Troops. This is one of several works by Eastman Johnson with African-American subjects.

References

1863 paintings
Religious paintings
Paintings by Eastman Johnson
Black people in art
Paintings in the collection of the Smithsonian American Art Museum
Books in art